Charter International plc was a large British engineering business based in London. It was acquired by Colfax Corporation in January 2012.

History
The British South Africa Company was founded in 1889 by Royal Charter. On the initiative of Anglo American Corporation it merged in 1965 with The Central Mining & Investment Corporation and The Consolidated Mines Selection Company to form Charter Consolidated. Slightly over one-third of the shares of the new company were owned by Anglo American Corporation. Its assets were mainly mining investments and its strategy was to develop as a mining finance house actively engaged in mineral exploration and the development of mines throughout the world.

In the 1980s Charter Consolidated disposed of its overseas mining concerns to concentrate on its British engineering interests.

In 1993 the company's name changed to Charter plc.

In 1994 it acquired ESAB and in 1997 it acquired Howden.

In 2008 the business was restructured with the creation of a new Irish resident holding company, Charter International plc.

The company was acquired by Colfax Corporation, an American company, in January 2012.

Operations
The company had two main businesses:
 ESAB: welding, cutting and automation
 Howden: air and gas handling

References

External links
 Official site

Engineering companies of the United Kingdom
Defunct companies based in London
Non-renewable resource companies established in 1965
1965 establishments in the United Kingdom
British South Africa Company
Technology companies disestablished in 2012
2012 disestablishments in the United Kingdom
Tax inversions